WUVR (1490 AM) is a radio station licensed to Lebanon, New Hampshire and serves the Lebanon-Hanover-White River Junction area. It broadcasts a news/talk format and is owned by Robert and John Landry, through licensee Sugar River Media, LLC.

History 
This station received its original construction permit from the Federal Communications Commission on September 2, 2004. The new station was assigned the WUVR call sign by the FCC on September 20, 2004; it signed on November 19 as a simulcast of WNTK-FM (99.7). The station received its license to cover from the FCC on January 26, 2005.

References

External links 
 

                   
 

UVR
Radio stations established in 2004
News and talk radio stations in the United States
Lebanon, New Hampshire
2004 establishments in New Hampshire